Turman Township is one of nine townships in Sullivan County, Indiana, United States. As of the 2010 census, its population was 1,061 and it contained 439 housing units.

Geography

Unincorporated towns
 Dodds Bridge at 
 Graysville at 
(This list is based on USGS data and may include former settlements.)

Adjacent townships
 Fairbanks Township (north)
 Curry Township (northeast)
 Hamilton Township (east)
 Gill Township (southeast)
 Hutsonville Township, Crawford County, Illinois (west)
 York Township, Clark County, Illinois (northwest)

Cemeteries
The township contains these seven cemeteries: Alkire, Burton, Island, Johnson, Mann, Poplar and Mt. Tabor.

Rivers
 Wabash River

School districts
 Southwest School Corporation
 Rural Community School Corporation

Political districts
 Indiana's 8th congressional district
 State House District 45
 State Senate District 39

References
 United States Census Bureau 2008 TIGER/Line Shapefiles
 United States Board on Geographic Names (GNIS)
 IndianaMap

External links
 Indiana Township Association
 United Township Association of Indiana

Townships in Sullivan County, Indiana
Terre Haute metropolitan area
Townships in Indiana